Trachymene ornata, or spongefruit, is a slender annual herb in the family Araliaceae. It is native to Australia and found in Western Australia, South Australia and New South Wales.

Description
The sparsely hairy leaves are deeply three-lobed almost to dissected. The inflorescence is an umbel of 3-6 flowers which are bisexual,  white or blue, and observed (in NSW) from July to October. The two-carpelled fruits split into two densely woolly mericarps with white (sometimes purplish) hairs.

Habitat
It grows in rocky places, and in shallow soils

Taxonomy
Trachymene ornata was first described by Stephan Endlicher in 1839, and redescribed by Druce in 1917 as belonging to the genus, Trachymene Rudge.

References

External links
 The Australasian Virtual Herbarium – Occurrence data

ornata
Flora of Western Australia
Flora of South Australia
Flora of New South Wales